Hosea is a Biblical prophet and primary author of the Book of Hosea in the Hebrew Bible

Hosea may also refer to:

Other religion uses 

 Book of Hosea, first book in the Twelve Minor Prophets of the Old Testament
 Hosea 1, first chapter of the book of Hosea
 Hosea 2, second chapter of the book of Hosea
 Hosea 3, third chapter of the book of Hosea
 Hosea 4, fourth chapter of the book of Hosea
 Hosea 5, fifth chapter of the book of Hosea
 Hosea 6, sixth chapter of the book of Hosea
 Hosea 7, seventh chapter of the book of Hosea
 Hosea 8, eighth chapter of the book of Hosea 
 Hosea 9, ninth chapter of the book of Hosea
 Hosea 10, tenth chapter of the book of Hosea
 Hosea 11, eleventh chapter of the book of Hosea
 Hosea 12, twelfth chapter of the book of Hosea
 Hosea 13, thirteenth chapter of the book of Hosea
 Hosea 14, fourteenth chapter of the book of Hosea

People

Given name 

 Hosea Ballou (1771–1852), American universalist clergyman and theological writer
 Hosea Ballou II (1796–1861), American universalist minister
 Hosea Ballou Morse (1855–1934), Canadian-born American customs official and Chinese historian
 Hosea Chanchez (born 1981), American actor
 Hosea Easton (1798–1837), American congregationalist, minister, abolitionist and author
 Hosea Jan "Ze" Frank (born 1972), American online performance artist, composer and humorist
 Hosea Garrett (1800–1888), American clergyman and philanthropist
 Hosea Hildreth (1792–1835), American educator and minister
 Hosea Holcombe (1780–1841), American church historian
 Hosea Hudson (1898–1988), American labor leader
 Hosea Jacobi (1841–1925), Chief Rabbi of Zagreb, Croatia
 Aadam Ismaeel Khamis (born Hosea Kosgei, 1989), Kenyan-born Bahraini long-distance runner 
 Hosea M. Knowlton (1847–1902), American District Attorney and Attorney general of Massachusetts
 Hosea Quimby (1804–1878), American Baptist pastor and author
 Hosea Rosenberg, American chef and winner of Top Chef: New York
 Hosea Stout (1810–1889),  American soldier, lawyer, Mormon pioneer and leader
 Hosea T. Lockard (1920–2011) American court judge from South Carolina
 Hosea Williams (1926–2000), American civil rights leader, activist, minister, philanthropist and businessman

Sportspeople 

 Hosea Allen (1918–1948), American baseball pitcher
 Hosea Burton (born 1988), British professional boxer
 Hosea Fortune (born 1959), American football wide receiver
 Hosea Macharinyang (born 1986), Kenyan runner
 Hosea Saumaki (born 1992), Tongan rugby union player
 Hosea Siner (1885–1948),  American baseball player
 Hosea Taylor (born 1958), American football player

Politicians 

 Hosea T. Botts (1873–1963), American attorney and politician, Mayor of Tillamook, Oregon 
 Hosea Ehinlanwo (born 1938), Nigerian senator
 Hosea Kiplagat (1945–2021), Kenyan politician and entrepreneur
 Hosea Kutako (1870–1970), Namibian politician
 Hosea Mann (1858–1948), American politician
 Hosea Moffit (1757–1825), U.S. representative from New York
 Hosea Washington Parker (1833–1922), U.S. representative from New Hampshire
 Hosea H. Rockwell (1840–1918), U.S. representative from New York
 Hosea Townsend (1840–1909), American attorney and U.S. representative from Colorado

Fictional characters 

 Hosea Biglow, fictional character from James Russell Lowell's book: The Biglow Papers
 Hosea Matthews, fictional character from Red Dead Redemption 2

Surname 

 Bobby Hosea (born 1955), American actor
 Trevor Hosea (born 1999), Australian rugby union player
 Birgitta Hosea (born 1966), British animator
 Addison Hosea (1914–1985), American prelate and bishop
 Chris Hosea (born 1973), American poet

Places 

 Hosea, Eswatini, inkhundla of Eswatini in the Shiselweni Region
 Hosea Kutako International Airport, airport in Namibia

Other uses 

 Hosea lobbii, sole plant species of the Hosea genus

See also 

 4Q166, also known as "The Hosea Commentary Scroll", one the Dead Sea Scrolls
 Hoshea, nineteenth and last king of the Israelite Kingdom of Israel